Three Orphan Kittens is a 1935 animated short film in the Silly Symphonies series produced by Walt Disney Productions. It was the winner of the 1935 Oscar for Academy Award for Best Short Subject (Cartoons). It was followed in 1936 by a sequel, More Kittens.

Plot 
The film tells the story of three kittens (one black, one orange and one grey) and their adventures in a house. It begins with the kittens left out in the snow. They then notice the house nearby and enter it for shelter. They arrive at its kitchen, and begin to play there after the house's African-American housekeeper has finished preparing a meal. After more playing in various areas of the house, the film switches its focus to one particular kitten, the black one, who is chasing a feather and eventually ends up on a pianola keyboard. The kitten starts to play with the feather walking down the piano keyboard and the feather lands on the 'on' switch with the kitten presses and the then-revealed pianola begins to play; ironically it is playing a variation of "Kitten on the Keys", a song composed by Zez Confrey in 1921. The other two kittens rejoin the first and play around the pianola. When the pianola finishes its song, the kittens leave it and are caught by the housekeeper. As she prepares to throw them out, she is stopped by a little girl (possibly version of Nancy), who decides to adopt the kittens.

Production 
The film was produced as an entry in Disney's Silly Symphonies series. At the time, the Symphonies were being used as a vehicle to test the techniques which would be used in Snow White and the Seven Dwarfs and to provide an informal on-the-job training program to prepare artists for the elaborate scenes that would be included in the studio's feature-length productions. As such, the films were intended to focus on the characters, which were intended to be cute, rather than a particularly developed narrative. It was directed by David Hand, who would later direct Snow White, and animated by Ken Anderson. Like all Silly Symphonies made after 1932, it was produced in three-strip Technicolor. The film was copyrighted on November 20, 1935, nearly a month after its release.

Releases 
The film was originally released theatrically in the United States on October 26, 1935. In 1937, it was re-released as part of the Academy Award Review of Walt Disney Cartoons, along with four other Academy Award-winning Disney shorts.

Home media 
In 1993, it appeared in a compilation videocassette of Award-winning Disney shorts entitled How the Best Was Won. It has also been found on VHS tapes of Dumbo, along with Father Noah's Ark and The Practical Pig.

The short was released on December 19, 2006 on Walt Disney Treasures: More Silly Symphonies, Volume Two.

Censorship 
The original version of Three Orphan Kittens contains a scene in which the black kitten encounters a doll that, when flipped by the kitten, becomes a stereotypical African-American girl, which shouts "Mammy!" (a recycled voice clip from Santa's Workshop). In the 1950s and 1960s, when Disney began editing their cartoons before they were broadcast on television, the scene was removed from the film. The film appeared uncensored, first on the VHS release of Dumbo, then on 2006 DVD More Silly Symphonies, where it was placed in a section entitled "From the Vault" along with other cartoons featuring stereotypes, which was prefaced with an introduction by Leonard Maltin.

Reception 
The Film Daily (Oct 31, 1935): "Looks as if Walt Disney has hit on something as entrancing as his three little pigs in these three kittens... The three cute kittens will prove a wow — especially in that sequence where they go to bat with the automatic playing piano and come off second best. That piece of business is a laugh riot."

National Exhibitor (Nov 20, 1935): "The three kittens come in out of the snow storm, upset household, exploring in the kitchen and parlor, spilling pies, smashing furniture. Excellent color and appealing characterizations of kittens mark this. Excellent."

Boxoffice (Dec 7, 1935): "Walt Disney's latest Silly Symphony promises to attract the popularity of his Three Little Pigs, certainly one of finest cartoon subjects ever produced. The kittens of the title role are just as cute as the little porkies of the previous short, while their adventures are so delightfully amusing that the patrons will exit from the theatre singing its praises... [The player-piano] proves to be the picture's high spot and will keep audiences in a riot of laughter. Color work is again excellent, short is ideal for youngsters, perfect for adults, and will fit into any bill, any time, any where."

Comic adaptation 
The Silly Symphony Sunday comic strip ran a three-month-long adaptation of Three Orphan Kittens called "Three Little Kittens" from July 28 to October 20, 1935.

Voice cast 
 Aunt Delilah: unknown
 Girl, Meows: Leone LeDoux
 Meows, Chirps: Esther Campbell

References

External links 
 

1935 films
1935 short films
1935 animated films
1930s Disney animated short films
Silly Symphonies
Best Animated Short Academy Award winners
Animated films about cats
Animated films about orphans
American animated short films
Films directed by David Hand
Films produced by Walt Disney
Films scored by Frank Churchill
Films about orphans
African-American animated films
1930s American films